American Indians or American Indian may refer to:

Indigenous groups of the Americas
 Indigenous peoples of the Americas
 Native Americans in the United States
 American Indian and Alaska Native, a U.S. Census category including American Indians
 First Nations (disambiguation), indigenous peoples of Canada

Other uses
 Americans in India, U.S. citizens living in India, or an Indian citizen of American descent
 Indian Americans, U.S. citizens with ancestry from India
 American Indian (magazine), a publication of the National Museum of the American Indian

See also
 Indian (disambiguation)
 Native Americans (disambiguation)